The List of painters in the Pinakothek is a list of the named artists in the Bavarian State Picture Collection whose works are in the collections of the Alte Pinakothek, Neue Pinakothek, or Pinakothek der Moderne. The list contains roughly 225 artists, but only named painters are listed alphabetically here. The artist's name is followed by the location(s) of their works. Of artists listed, there are only 4 women, including Angelica Kauffman, Rachel Ruysch, Teresa Hubbard of the artist duo Teresa Hubbard / Alexander Birchler, and Marie-Gabrielle Capet.
For the complete list of artists and their artworks in the collection, see the website.
Andreas Achenbach (1815–1910), Neue Pinakothek
Albrecht Altdorfer (1480–1538), Alte Pinakothek
Friedrich von Amerling (1803–1887), Neue Pinakothek
Fra Angelico (1387–1455), Alte Pinakothek
Gabriel Angler (1405–1462), Alte Pinakothek
Balthasar van der Ast (1593–1656), Alte Pinakothek
Hans Baldung (1484–1545), Alte Pinakothek
Federico Barocci (1530–1612), Alte Pinakothek
Georg Baselitz (b.1938), Pinakothek der Moderne
Max Beckmann (1884–1950), Pinakothek der Moderne
Joseph Beuys (1921–1986), Pinakothek der Moderne, Neue Pinakothek
Carl Blechen (1797–1840), Neue Pinakothek
Karl Blossfeldt (1865–1932), Neue Pinakothek
Arnold Böcklin (1827–1901), Neue Pinakothek
Pierre Bonnard (1867–1947), Neue Pinakothek
Sandro Botticelli (1444–1510), Neue Pinakothek
François Boucher (1703–1770), Alte Pinakothek
Sébastien Bourdon (1616–1671), Alte Pinakothek
Dieric Bouts (1415–1475), Alte Pinakothek
Adriaen Brouwer (1605–1638), Alte Pinakothek
Pieter Bruegel the Elder (1526–1569), Alte Pinakothek
Jan Brueghel the Elder (1568–1624), Alte Pinakothek
Hans Burgkmair (1473–1540), Alte Pinakothek
Heinrich Bürkel (1802–1869), Neue Pinakothek
Antonio Canova (1757–1822), Neue Pinakothek
Marie-Gabrielle Capet (1761–1818), Neue Pinakothek
Franz Ludwig Catel (1778–1856), Neue Pinakothek
Paul Cézanne (1839–1906), Neue Pinakothek
John Chamberlain (sculptor) (1927–2011), Pinakothek der Moderne
Jean-Baptiste-Siméon Chardin (1699–1779), Alte Pinakothek
Cima da Conegliano (ca. 1459–1517/18), Alte Pinakothek
John Constable (1776–1837), Neue Pinakothek
Lovis Corinth (1858–1925), Neue Pinakothek
Peter Cornelius (1783–1867), Neue Pinakothek
Gustave Courbet (1819–1877), Neue Pinakothek
Lucas Cranach the Elder (1472–1553), Alte Pinakothek
Leonardo da Vinci (1452–1519), Alte Pinakothek
Johan Christian Dahl (1788–1857), Neue Pinakothek
Cornelis van Dalem (1530–1576), Alte Pinakothek
Honoré Daumier (1808–1879), Neue Pinakothek
Gerard David (1460–1523), Alte Pinakothek
Jacques-Louis David (1748–1825), Neue Pinakothek
Franz von Defregger (1835–1921), Neue Pinakothek
Edgar Degas (1834–1917), Neue Pinakothek
Eugène Delacroix (1798–1863), Neue Pinakothek
Robert Delaunay (1885–1941), Pinakothek der Moderne
Johann Georg von Dillis (1759–1841), Neue Pinakothek
Albrecht Dürer (1471–1528), Alte Pinakothek
Anthony van Dyck (1599–1641), Alte Pinakothek
Johann Georg Edlinger (1741–1819), Neue Pinakothek
Adam Elsheimer (1578–1610), Alte Pinakothek
James Ensor (1860–1949), Neue Pinakothek
Max Ernst (1891–1976), Pinakothek der Moderne
Carel Fabritius (1622–1654), Alte Pinakothek
Anselm Feuerbach (1829–1880), Neue Pinakothek
Dan Flavin (1933–1996), Pinakothek der Moderne
Frans Francken the Younger (1581–1642), Alte Pinakothek
Caspar David Friedrich (1774–1840), Neue Pinakothek
Ernst Fries (1801–1833), Neue Pinakothek
Thomas Gainsborough (1727–1788), Neue Pinakothek
Louis Gallait (1810–1887), Neue Pinakothek
Paul Gauguin (1848–1903), Neue Pinakothek
Orazio Gentileschi (1563–1639), Alte Pinakothek
Théodore Géricault (1791–1824), Neue Pinakothek
Domenico Ghirlandaio (1449–1494), Alte Pinakothek
Giotto (1266–1337), Alte Pinakothek
Vincent van Gogh (1853–1890), Neue Pinakothek
Hendrik Goltzius (1558–1617), Alte Pinakothek
Jan Gossaert (1478–1532), Alte Pinakothek
Francisco Goya (1746–1828), Neue Pinakothek
Anton Graff (1736–1813), Neue Pinakothek
El Greco (1541–1614), Alte Pinakothek
George Grosz (1893–1959), Pinakothek der Moderne
Matthias Grünewald (1470/80-1528), Alte Pinakothek
Francesco Guardi (1712–1793), Alte Pinakothek
Wade Guyton (b.1972), Neue Pinakothek
Jacob Philipp Hackert (1737–1807), Neue Pinakothek
Frans Hals (1582–1666), Alte Pinakothek
Johann Peter Hasenclever (1810–1853), Neue Pinakothek
Heinrich Maria von Hess (1798–1863), Neue Pinakothek
Peter von Hess (1792–1871), Neue Pinakothek
Rudolf Hirth du Frênes (1846–1916), Neue Pinakothek
Ferdinand Hodler (1853–1918), Neue Pinakothek
Karl Hofer (1878–1955), Pinakothek der Moderne
Ludwig von Hofmann (1861–1945), Neue Pinakothek
Hans Holbein the Elder (1460–1524), Alte Pinakothek
Teresa Hubbard / Alexander Birchler (b. 1962 & 1965), Neue Pinakothek
Abraham Janssens (1570–1632), Alte Pinakothek
Jacob Jordaens (1593–1678), Alte Pinakothek
Willem Kalf (1619–1693), Alte Pinakothek
Wassily Kandinsky (1866–1944), Pinakothek der Moderne
Angelica Kauffman (1741–1807), Neue Pinakothek
Wilhelm von Kaulbach (1804–1874), Neue Pinakothek
Albert von Keller (1844/1845–1920), Neue Pinakothek
Georg Friedrich Kersting (1785–1847), Neue Pinakothek
Ernst Ludwig Kirchner (1880–1938), Neue Pinakothek
Leo von Klenze (1784–1864), Neue Pinakothek
Gustav Klimt (1862–1918), Neue Pinakothek
Max Klinger (1857–1920), Neue Pinakothek
Wilhelm von Kobell (1766–1853), Neue Pinakothek
Joseph Anton Koch (1768–1839), Neue Pinakothek
Philip de Koninck (1619–1688), Alte Pinakothek
Willem de Kooning (1904–1997), Pinakothek der Moderne
Nicolas Lancret (1690–1743), Alte Pinakothek
Pieter Lastman (1583–1633), Alte Pinakothek
Thomas Lawrence (1769–1830), Neue Pinakothek
Wilhelm Leibl (1844–1900), Neue Pinakothek
Franz von Lenbach (1836–1904), Neue Pinakothek
Lucas van Leyden (1494–1533), Alte Pinakothek
Max Liebermann (1847–1935), Neue Pinakothek
Adolf Heinrich Lier (1826–1882), Neue Pinakothek
Filippo Lippi (1406–1469), Alte Pinakothek
Johann Liss (1590–1629), Alte Pinakothek
Stefan Lochner (c. 1400–1451), Alte Pinakothek, Neue Pinakothek
Claude Lorrain (1604–1682), Alte Pinakothek
Lorenzo Lotto (1480–1556), Alte Pinakothek
August Macke (1887–1914), Pinakothek der Moderne
René Magritte (1898–1967), Pinakothek der Moderne
Aristide Maillol (1861–1944), Neue Pinakothek
Hans Makart (1840–1884), Neue Pinakothek
Édouard Manet (1832–1883), Neue Pinakothek
Hans von Marées (1837–1887), Neue Pinakothek
Jacob Maris (1837–1899), Neue Pinakothek
Willem Maris (1844–1910), Neue Pinakothek
Masolino da Panicale (1383–1447), Alte Pinakothek
Henri Matisse (1869–1954), Pinakothek der Moderne
Gabriel Cornelius von Max (1840–1915), Neue Pinakothek
Eduard van der Meer (1846–1889), Neue Pinakothek
Master of Saint Veronica (1400–1420), Alte Pinakothek
Master of the Saint Bartholomew Altarpiece (1465–1510), Alte Pinakothek
Hans Memling (1430–1494), Alte Pinakothek
Lippo Memmi (1291–1356), Alte Pinakothek
Adolph Menzel (1815–1905), Neue Pinakothek
Jean-François Millet (1814–1875), Neue Pinakothek
Claude Monet (1840–1926), Neue Pinakothek
Bartolomé Esteban Murillo (1617–1682), Alte Pinakothek
François-Joseph Navez (1787–1869), Neue Pinakothek
Emil Nolde (1867–1956), Pinakothek der Moderne
Ferdinand Olivier (1785–1841), Neue Pinakothek
Friedrich Overbeck (1789–1869), Neue Pinakothek
Michael Pacher (c. 1435–1498), Alte Pinakothek
Blinky Palermo (1943–1977), Pinakothek der Moderne
Juan Pantoja de la Cruz (1553–1608), Alte Pinakothek
Parmigianino (1503–1540), Alte Pinakothek
Pablo Picasso (1881–1973), Neue Pinakothek, Pinakothek der Moderne
Karl von Piloty (1826–1886), Neue Pinakothek
Frans Post (1612–1680), Alte Pinakothek
Nicolas Poussin (1594–1665), Alte Pinakothek
Domenico Quaglio the Younger (1787–1837), Neue Pinakothek
Arthur von Ramberg (1819–1875), Neue Pinakothek
Raphael (1483–1520), Alte Pinakothek
Ferdinand von Rayski (1806–1890), Neue Pinakothek
Josef Rebell (1787–1828), Neue Pinakothek
Johann Christian Reinhart (1761–1847), Neue Pinakothek
Rembrandt (1606–1669), Alte Pinakothek
Guido Reni (1575–1642), Alte Pinakothek
Pierre-Auguste Renoir (1841–1919), Neue Pinakothek
Joshua Reynolds (1723–1792), Neue Pinakothek
Adrian Ludwig Richter (1803–1884), Neue Pinakothek
August Riedel (1799–1883), Neue Pinakothek
Auguste Rodin (1840–1917), Neue Pinakothek
Johann Martin von Rohden (1778–1868), Neue Pinakothek
Carl Rottmann (1798–1850), Neue Pinakothek
Peter Paul Rubens (1577–1640), Alte Pinakothek
Jacob Isaacksz van Ruisdael (1628–1682), Alte Pinakothek
Philipp Otto Runge (1777–1810), Neue Pinakothek
Rachel Ruysch (1664–1750), Alte Pinakothek
Théo van Rysselberghe (1862–1926), Neue Pinakothek
Pieter Jansz. Saenredam (1597–1665), Alte Pinakothek
Carlo Saraceni (1579–1620), Alte Pinakothek
Friedrich Wilhelm Schadow (1789–1862), Neue Pinakothek
Ridolfo Schadow (1786–1822), Neue Pinakothek
Egon Schiele (1890–1918), Neue Pinakothek
Karl Friedrich Schinkel (1781–1841), Neue Pinakothek
Eduard Schleich the Elder (1812–1874), Neue Pinakothek
Oskar Schlemmer (1888–1943), Pinakothek der Moderne
Martin Schongauer (1440–1491), Alte Pinakothek
Carl Schuch (1846–1902), Neue Pinakothek
Moritz von Schwind (1804–1871), Neue Pinakothek
Jan Siberechts (1627–1703), Alte Pinakothek
Luca Signorelli (1441–1523), Alte Pinakothek
Max Slevogt (1868–1932), Neue Pinakothek
Johann Sperl (1840–1914), Neue Pinakothek
Carl Spitzweg (1808–1885), Neue Pinakothek
Joseph Karl Stieler (1781–1858), Neue Pinakothek
Bernhard Strigel (1460–1528), Alte Pinakothek
George Stubbs (1724–1806), Neue Pinakothek
Franz von Stuck (1863–1928), Neue Pinakothek
Michiel Sweerts (1618–1664), Alte Pinakothek
David Teniers the Younger (1610–1690), Alte Pinakothek
Gerard ter Borch (1617–1681), Alte Pinakothek
Berthel Thorvaldsen (1768/70-1844), Neue Pinakothek
Giovanni Battista Tiepolo (1696–1770), Alte Pinakothek
Domenico Tintoretto (1560–1635), Alte Pinakothek
Tintoretto (1518–1594), Alte Pinakothek
Titian (1485–1576), Alte Pinakothek
Henri de Toulouse-Lautrec (1864–1901), Neue Pinakothek
Maurice Quentin de La Tour (1704–1788), Alte Pinakothek
J. M. W. Turner (1775–1851), Neue Pinakothek
Fritz von Uhde (1848–1911), Neue Pinakothek
Diego Velázquez (1599–1660), Alte Pinakothek
Esaias van de Velde (1587–1630), Alte Pinakothek
Henry van de Velde (1863–1957), Neue Pinakothek
Willem van de Velde the Younger (1633–1707), Alte Pinakothek
Carle Vernet (1758–1836), Neue Pinakothek
Claude Joseph Vernet (1714–1789), Alte Pinakothek
Ferdinand Georg Waldmüller (1793–1865), Neue Pinakothek
Andy Warhol (1928–1987), Pinakothek der Moderne
Joseph Wenglein (1845–1919), Neue Pinakothek
Adriaen van der Werff (1659–1722), Alte Pinakothek
Rogier van der Weyden (1400–1464), Alte Pinakothek
David Wilkie (artist) (1785–1841), Neue Pinakothek
Richard Wilson (painter) (1713/1714–1782), Neue Pinakothek
Franz Xaver Winterhalter (1805–1873), Neue Pinakothek
Francisco de Zurbarán (1598–1664), Alte Pinakothek

References
Pinakothek website
 :commons:Category:Bayerische Staatsgemäldesammlungen
 Netherlands Institute for Art History

Pinakothek
Pinakothek painters
Pinakothek painters
Pinakothek